is a railway station  located in the city of Obanazawa, Yamagata Prefecture, Japan, operated by East Japan Railway Company (JR East).

Lines
Ashisawa Station is served by the Ōu Main Line, and is located 133.7 rail kilometers from the terminus of the line at Fukushima Station.

Station layout
Ashisawa station has two opposed side platforms, connected to the station building by a footbridge. The station is staffed.

Platforms

History
Ashisawa Station opened on December 1, 1916. The station was absorbed into the JR East network upon the privatization of the JNR on April 1, 1987.

Passenger statistics
In fiscal 2018, the JR portion of the station was used by an average of 45 passengers daily (boarding passengers only).

Surrounding area
Although located within the city limits of Obanazawa, Ashisawa Station is located in a rural area isolated from the city center by a range of mountains.
Mogami River

See also
List of railway stations in Japan

References

External links

 JR East Station information 

Railway stations in Japan opened in 1916
Railway stations in Yamagata Prefecture
Ōu Main Line
Obanazawa, Yamagata